Box Hill Central Shopping Centre is a regional shopping centre complex (made up of two separate centres) located in the eastern Melbourne suburb of Box Hill in Victoria, Australia.

History

Box Hill Central – North
Box Hill Central – North was originally constructed in the early 1970s. It was opened in 1975 as a three level regional shopping centre, called Whitehorse Plaza. It housed anchor tenants such as Coles, Kmart, and Venture, with other notable tenants being Sussans, Williams The Shoeman, Priceline, Lincraft, and Medicare along with other retailers, eateries, and services.

Due to the lack of tenants, it was closed down in 2000. The shopping centre was completely redeveloped. All tenancies within the centre were demolished, the main shopping centre layout and car parks were reconfigured, and there was major refurbishment of external and internal facades. It was reopened on 1 July 2003 by Centro Properties Group as Centro Whitehorse (although called Whitehorse City while under redevelopment), a two level regional shopping centre with Coles and Best & Less clothing store.

In 2007, Centro Whitehorse was re-branded as Centro Box Hill North and partially redeveloped, with Best & Less being closed down and the space turned into a brand new Harris Scarfe store.

In 2013, it was re-branded to Box Hill Central - North, as a result of an organisation-wide re-branding of all centres owned by Federation Limited.

On 2 February 2020, Harris Scarfe closed its store at Box Hill, as part of its restructure and downsizing of its store count. The store was bought by Dimmeys and reopened.  The Coles supermarket closed in August 2022 and relocated to Box Hill Central - South.

Box Hill Central – South
Box Hill Central – South was originally constructed in the early 1980s, when the old Box Hill railway station and level crossing was removed, and Market and Main Streets were closed to traffic. Box Hill Central opened in 1987, as a single level regional shopping centre. It housed anchor tenants - Target and Safeway.

The shopping centre was redeveloped in 1998 and in 2000 was acquired by the Centro Properties Group, who renamed it to Centro Box Hill South, though many still referred to it as Box Hill Central.

In 2010, the shopping centre was again redeveloped, with Target converted into Big W, and Safeway being renovated and reopened as Woolworths.

In 2013, it was again re-branded, as Box Hill Central – South, as a result of an organisation wide re-branding of all centres owned by Federation Limited.

The shopping centre has a large indoor fresh food market located along the eastern edge of the complex. The original market opened in 1895 and was consolidated into the shopping centre when it was developed.

Along with Big W in Broadmeadows Central, Big W in Box Hill Central closed in January 2021. A new Coles supermarket opened in a section of the old Big W in August 2022.

Tenants

This is made up of 2 anchor tenants (Coles and Woolworths) and over 190 retailers, eateries and service providers. Other retailers in Box Hill Central include EB Games, Priceline Pharmacy, Daiso and Dimmeys. The shopping centres also have 2,537 parking spaces, as well as approximately 100 office suites in office towers. Previous tenants of Box Hill Central are Big W, Kmart, Kmart Food, Target, Venture, Harris Scarfe, Best & Less and more.

The Box Hill region is known for its Hong Kong Chinese population, with smaller groups of mainland Chinese, Taiwanese and Vietnamese. This is reflected in the produce in food markets, medicinal herb retailers and clothing shops. In addition to European market offerings, the market area has some shops focusing on traditional Asian foods.

Box Hill Central (North and South) has an annual turnover in excess of A$150 million.

Transport
Box Hill Central was built above Box Hill station and the entrance is contained inside the shopping centre. The complex also has a major bus interchange, with tram route 109 terminating nearby on Whitehorse Road. It passes through the inner eastern suburbs en route to Port Melbourne via the Melbourne central business district. There are a few bus stops situated around both the shopping centres and they are both situated in Zone 2. Box Hill Central has 7 levels of undercover car parking. The shopping centre has bicycle racks located at most major entrances as well as an on-site taxi rank.

References

External links

Buildings and structures in the City of Whitehorse
Bus stations in Australia
Shopping centres in Melbourne
Shopping malls established in 1987
1987 establishments in Australia